The hepatitis C virus 3′X element is an RNA element which contains three stem-loop structures that are essential for replication.

See also 
 Hepatitis C alternative reading frame stem-loop
 Hepatitis C stem-loop IV
 Hepatitis C virus stem-loop VII
 Hepatitis C virus (HCV) cis-acting replication element (CRE)

References

External links 
 

Cis-regulatory RNA elements
Hepatitis C virus